Gradinje may refer to:

Croatia 
Gradinje, Cerovlje, settlement in the Municipality of Cerovlje
, settlement in the Municipality of Oprtalj

Serbia 
Gradinje, Serbia, settlement in the Municipality of Dimitrovgrad

Slovenia 
Gradnje, Krško, settlement in the Municipality of Krško (known as Gradinje until 1990)

See also
Gradina (disambiguation)